Unilever Sri Lanka is a Sri Lankan consumer goods company located in Colombo. It is wholly owned by Unilever, a British multinational consumer goods company. Its products include food, beauty products, personal care, pharmaceuticals, and baby products. Unilever Sri Lanka was established in 1938 as Lever Brother Ceylon Limited. In 1972, it was renamed Unilever Sri Lanka. The company has been ranked as Most Valuable and Strongest Brand and Most Respected Entity. The company has over two dozen brands that are market leaders in Sri Lanka since the 1940s. Unilever operates from a factory complex in an industrial zone of Horana since 2012. About 96% of the company's products are manufactured locally, and more than twenty of its brands are exported outside Sri Lanka.

Awards
Unilever Sri Lanka's largest factory facility, in Horana, is ISO 9001-certified. It manufactures up to 200 products, covering fourteen brands.
In 2015, the company won the SLIM Brand Excellence award.
Unilever Sri Lanka has developed a plastic-free, environmentally friendly packaging system. It was awarded the first eco-friendly baby product SLS certification in 2020.

Unilever Sri Lanka brands

See also
 List of food companies
 List of largest companies in Sri Lanka

References

External links
 

1938 establishments in Ceylon
Food and drink companies of Sri Lanka
Privately held companies of Sri Lanka